Barbara Dudley Alexander is an American infectious disease physician. She is a professor of medicine and pathology at the Duke University School of Medicine.

Alexander earned an M.D. at ECU Brody School of Medicine in 1993. She completed a residency in medicine at Duke University. She conducted a fellowship in infectious diseases at Duke University. Alexander was president of the Infectious Diseases Society of America.

References 

Living people
Place of birth missing (living people)
Year of birth missing (living people)
East Carolina University alumni
Duke University School of Medicine faculty
American infectious disease physicians
21st-century American women physicians
21st-century American physicians
American medical researchers
Women medical researchers
Physicians from North Carolina
Physician-scientists